Santa Teresa del Tuy is a city in the state of Miranda, Venezuela. It is the capital of Independencia Municipality.

Cities in Miranda (state)
Populated places established in 1761